The Starlight Parade is an annual parade held in Portland, Oregon, in the United States, as part of the Portland Rose Festival. The 2017 events saw more than 300,000 spectators.

There was no parade in 2020.

References

External links
 

Annual events in Portland, Oregon
Parades in the United States